The Illinois High School Boys Basketball Championship is a single elimination tournament held each spring in the United States.  It is organized by the Illinois High School Association (IHSA).

From 1908 to 1971, it was a single tournament contested by nearly all high schools in Illinois.  In 1972, the tournament was divided into two divisions based on school size, (A and AA), each producing a separate champion.  In 2008, the tournament was divided into four separate divisions (1A, 2A, 3A, and 4A being the larger schools).  The Illinois High School Basketball Championship was the first tournament to be called 'March Madness'.  The term was first used about the Illinois tournament in 1939, decades before it was used about NCAA basketball tournament.

Advancement
Under the current four class system, teams are assigned to a class, based on the student population, with adjustments made for single gender schools, and for schools which are not four year high schools.  Within the class, schools are geographically assigned to a regional, which is, in turn assigned to a sectional which, finally, is assigned to a super-sectional. Regional tournaments are generally between four and eight teams, depending on the number of teams in a geographic area in a particular class. There are four regional tournaments within each sectional and two sectionals within each super-sectional. Each tournament is single elimination.

Within the regional, coaches seed the teams. The winners of the four regional tournaments then meet in a single elimination sectional tournament. The teams are not re-seeded after regional play, and the winners of the regional tournament are randomly assigned, in advance, to play the winner of one of the other regionals in the sectional semifinals.

For example, in 2011, in the Class 2A Casey Sectional, there were four regionals: Flora, Monticello, St. Joseph and Robinson. Three of these regionals consisted of five teams and one of six. Before the playoffs began, the IHSA assigned the winner of the Flora Regional (which ended up being Teutopolis) to play the winner of the Monticello Regional (Champaign St. Thomas). The winners of the St. Joseph and Robinson regionals played in the other regional semifinal, with the winners of the two semifinals met in the sectional championship.

The winner of the sectional tournament then faces the winner of another (geographically close) sectional champion for the super-sectional championship. This winner advances to the state tournament.

The state tournament in each class is composed of the four super-sectional winners, and are randomly assigned to play each other in the semifinal round.  The winners of the semifinal round compete for the state championship the next evening, while the semifinal losers compete for third place the next day.  The state semifinals are generally held on a Friday, with the championship and third place games held on Saturday.  Classes 1A and 2A share the same weekend, while 3A and 4A compete the weekend after that.

Under the current four class system, each class has four super sectional games, and thus 8 sectionals. Each sectional has four regionals, giving each class 32 regional tournaments.

The format in the two class system (1972–2007) was similar.  In the two class system, each class had 8 super-sectional games, and thus 16 sectionals and 64 regionals.  The winners of the 8 super-sectional games advanced to the state tournament.  On the Friday of the state tournament, the 8 winners were randomly assigned to play each other in a quarterfinal game.  The winners advanced to the semifinals, which were played on the next day.  The semifinal losers played for third place in the early evening, while the semifinal winners contested the state championship in the evening.  Class A would play one weekend, and Class AA the next weekend.

Prior to 1972, when there was only one tournament for all schools to compete in, there were a variety of formats in use.

The IHSA Girls Basketball tournament is organized in exactly the same way as the boys' tournament; however, the girls' tournament begins two weeks before the boys' tournament.

Title game results

1908–1920

1921–1940

1941–1960

1961–1971

1972–1981

1982–1991

1992–2007

2008–present

Sites

The tournament was originally organized only with the permission of the IHSA, but after one year was taken over by the Association.  The tournament spent 77 years playing at the University of Illinois at Urbana–Champaign (UIUC) before moving to Bradley University's Carver Arena in Peoria from 1996-2019. The 2020 tournament was cancelled due to the COVID-19 pandemic, and on June 15, 2020, the IHSA announced the tournament would move back to UIUC's State Farm Center.

 1908: Oak Park YMCA
 1909-1910: Bloomington YMCA
 1911, 1913: Bradley University
 1912, 1914: Decatur YMCA
 1915: Millikin University
 1918: Springfield High School
 1919-1925: Kenney Gym at UIUC
 1926-1962: Huff Gym at UIUC
 1963-1995, 2022-present: State Farm Center at UIUC
 1996–2019: Peoria Civic Center

Additional events

The Happening
In 1992, the IHSA added a three-point contest and a slam dunk contest (collectively called "The Happening") to coincide with the boys basketball state series.  The state level of each contest is held on the Thursday evening before their respective class' state semifinals (quarterfinals before 2008), with each class crowning a champion in each contest on the Saturday of their state championship game.  After the Class 3A and 4A champions have been determined, there is a final "King of the Hill" contest among the four class champion to crown the overall champion.

The slam dunk contest has no preliminaries prior to the Thursday competition of the week of the state finals.  Players are nominated by the coaches of their regional or sectional tournament.  Those willing to participate advance automatically to the state preliminaries.

The three point contest starts at the beginning of the regional tournaments.  Each team may select up to 4 players to compete, with a total of four players advancing to the next level of competition.  As teams advance through regional and sectional, the winning individuals advance, irrespective of their team's success.

March Madness Experience
Since 1996, in addition to the on court activities, the IHSA has set up an interactive event at the Peoria Civic Center called the March Madness Experience.  Set up in the  Exhibit Hall, the "Experience" includes interactive games and skill challenges for fans to participate in.  Big screen televisions allow fans to watch the current game being played on the court, and radio and television broadcasts originate from the floor.  The "Experience" opens on the Thursday of each week of the State Championship Tournament, and remains open throughout the tournament.

Wheelchair Basketball
Starting in 2004, the first weekend of the State Championship Tournament also hosts the state high school championship for wheelchair basketball.  The tournament is a round robin tournament, and is composed of teams of high school students, though the teams are not necessarily affiliated with a particular school.

Century of Memories

The IHSA celebrated 100 years of the IHSA State Tournament in the 2006-07 season.  A list of "100 Legends of the IHSA Boys Basketball Tournament" was assembled.  Several of the living members of that team made appearances at select games across the state, and signed a "Ball of Fame" which was subsequently raffled off at the state tournament.  Commemorative books and videos were available.  Among the notable members of the "Legends" team were Kenny Battle, Lou Boudreau, Jim Brewer, Quinn Buckner, Landon "Sonny" Cox, Bruce Douglas, Dwight "Dike" Eddleman, LaPhonso Ellis, Melvin Ely, Michael Finley, C. J. Kupec, Marcus Liberty, Shaun Livingston, Cuonzo Martin, Johnny Orr, Andy Phillip, Quentin Richardson, Dave Robisch, Cazzie Russell, Jon Scheyer, Jack Sikma, Isiah Thomas, Frank Williams, and George Wilson.

State title forfeiture
The 2005 Class A state title resulted in the only forfeiture of a state boys basketball title in Illinois history.  The title game resulted in a victory for Chicago's Hales Franciscan High School over Winnebago.  It was the second year in a row Winnebago had lost in the final game, and was the second time in three years that Hales Franciscan had won.

Hales Franciscan's basketball team had been at the center of problems for over a year.  In 2004, the school had been kicked out of the IHSA state series when recruiting violations had been uncovered.

In November, 2005, the IHSA announced that it was suspending Hales Franciscan's membership in the Association, when it was learned that the school's Illinois State Board of Education (ISBE) recognition had been lapsed in June, 2003.

In January, 2006, the IHSA announced that due to the lack of recognition (ISBE), Hales Franciscan would forfeit all athletic contests played between June, 2003 and December, 2005, including its 2005 State Championship.

See also
 Illinois High School Association
 March Madness (disambiguation)
 Peoria, Illinois
 Will it play in Peoria?—the IHSA often uses "Playing in Peoria" as a part of its advertising for the state championship

References

Also see John Pruett (Illinois High School Career Field Goal Percentage Champion)

External links
 Illinois High School Association: Boys Basketball
 IHSA Boys Basketball Records Menu
 A Brief History of March Madness (includes the text of H.V. Porter's original poem)

High school sports in Illinois
High school basketball competitions in the United States
Annual sporting events in the United States